Gabrovnik is a settlement in the Municipality of Slovenske Konjice in eastern Slovenia. It lies in the hills northeast of Slovenske Konjice. The area is part of the traditional region of Styria. The municipality is now included in the Savinja Statistical Region.

References

External links

Gabrovnik at Geopedia

Populated places in the Municipality of Slovenske Konjice